The Charlotte Rangers, based in Port Charlotte, Florida, were an American minor league baseball team that existed from 1987 through 2002. The team played at Charlotte County Stadium as a Class A Florida State League affiliate of the Texas Rangers, who at the time made their spring training base in Port Charlotte.

During their 16-year history, the Charlotte Rangers won two FSL championships (1989 and 2002) and sent players such as Juan González, Iván Rodríguez, Kenny Rogers, Kevin Brown and Carlos Peña to Major League Baseball.

When the parent Rangers moved their spring training operation to Arizona in 2003, the Charlotte franchise was sold to the St. Louis Cardinals and moved across the state to Jupiter, Florida, where it plays as the Palm Beach Cardinals.

The Charlotte Stone Crabs, FSL affiliate of the Tampa Bay Rays, eventually replaced the Rangers, moving from Vero Beach in 2009.

Notable alumni

Baseball Hall of Fame alumni

 Ivan Rodriguez (1989) Inducted, 2017

Notable alumni

 Wilson Alvarez (1989) MLB All-Star

 Rich Aurilia (1992) MLB All-Star

 Joaquin Benoit (1999)

 Hank Blalock (2001) 2 x MLB All-Star

 Brian Bohanon (1989)

 Kevin Brown (1987) 6 x MLB All-Star; 2 x AL ERA Title (1996, 2000)

 Mark Clark (1999)

 Doug Davis (1997-1998)

 R. A. Dickey (1997-1998) MLB All-Star; 2012 NL Cy Young Award

 Juan Gonzalez (1988, 2002) 3 x MLB All-Star; 2 x AL Most Valuable Player (1996, 1998)

 Rusty Greer (1991)

 Tom Goodwin (1999)

 Travis Hafner (2000)

 Aaron Harang (2000) 

 Bill Haselman (1988)

 Rick Helling (1992)

 Jose Hernandez (1990) MLB All-Star

 Bruce Hurst (1994) MLB All-Star

 Danny Kolb (2001) MLB All-Star

 Chad Kreuter (1987)

 Mike Lamb (1998)

 Colby Lewis (2000-2001) 

 Rob Nen (1990) 3 x MLB All-Star; 2001 NL Saves Leader

 Lance Nix (2001-2002)

 Darren Oliver (1991-1992, 1996)

 Dean Palmer (1988) MLB All-Star

 Roger Pavlik (1989, 1994) MLB All-Star

 Carlos Pena (1998-1999) MLB All-Star

 Kenny Rogers (1987-1988) 4 x MLB All-Star

 Jeff Russell (1987, 1996) 2 x MLB All-Star; 1989 AL Saves Leader

 Rey Sanchez (1988)

 Mike Scioscia (1994) 2 x MLB All-Star; 2 x AL Manager of the Year; Manager: 2002 World Champion Anaheim Angels

 Sammy Sosa (1988) 6 x MLB All-Star; 1998 NL Most Valuable Player

 Fernando Tatis (1996)

 Mark Teixeria (2002) 5 x Gold Glove; 3 x MLB All-Star

 Todd Van Poppel (1997)

 Bump Wills (1992)

 C.J. Wilson (2002) 2 x MLB All-Star

 Butch Wynegar (1995-1997, MGR) 2 x MLB All-Star

 Jeff Zimmerman (1998) MLB All-Star

See also
Rich Aurelia also graduated to the majors.Charlotte Stone Crabs

External links
 Baseball Reference

Baseball teams established in 1987
Baseball teams disestablished in 2002
Defunct Florida State League teams
Texas Rangers minor league affiliates
Defunct baseball teams in Florida
1987 establishments in Florida
2002 disestablishments in Florida